Pierre de Voyer d'Argenson may refer to:

 Marc-Pierre de Voyer de Paulmy, comte d'Argenson, 18th century French politician
 Pierre de Voyer d'Argenson (Governor), Vicomte de Mouzay, Governor of New France (1658–1661)